Peng Peng (born 24 November 2000) is a Chinese professional footballer currently playing as a goalkeeper for Kunshan.

Club career
Peng joined Shanghai Shenhua's youth academy in 2018 after the club bought Genbao Football Base's under-19 players. He would be loaned out to second tier club Shanghai Shenxin for the 2019 China League One season, where he would make is professional debut on 9 March 2019 against Changchun Yatai in a 4-1 defeat. His loan was terminated early and he subsequently joined another second tier club in Qingdao Huanghai on 19 July 2019. His season would end early after he broke his toe after only his second appearance for the team, however despite his small contribution he was part of the team achieved promotion to the Chinese Super League at the end of the season.

On 8 January 2020, Peng joined China League Two club Kunshan permanently. The team would eventually receive a late promotion and participated the 2020 China League One following the disbandment of Tianjin Tianhai. Peng would make his debut in a league game on 13 September 2020 against Sichuan Jiuniu in a 2-0 victory. He would go on to take the opportunity to establish himself as a vital member within the team that won the division and promotion to the top tier at the end of the 2022 China League One campaign.

Career statistics
.

Honours

Club 
Qingdao Huanghai
 China League One: 2019

Kunshan
 China League One: 2022

References

External links
Peng Peng at Worldfootball.net

2000 births
Living people
Chinese footballers
China youth international footballers
Association football goalkeepers
China League One players
Shanghai Shenhua F.C. players
Shanghai Shenxin F.C. players
Qingdao F.C. players
Kunshan F.C. players